Barbara McGrady (born 1950) is an Aboriginal Australian photographer and photojournalist based in Sydney, New South Wales. She is the first Indigenous Australian photojournalist.

Early life and education
Barbara McGrady was born in 1950 in Mungindi, New South Wales. She is a Gomeroi (Gamilaraay) / Murri woman, from  the north-west of NSW and southern Queensland.

She has lived in two worlds, Black and White. Her aunts were removed from the family and sent to Cootamundra Girls' Home, while the men were sent to work as indentured labourers.

McGrady started taking photos of her family and surroundings as a teenager with a camera her mother bought her. Her fascination with photo journalism was sparked by black and white photographs of black sportsmen and sportswomen in magazines like Time and Life, National Geographic, Esquire and Reader's Digest.

She trained as a sociologist, and is an athlete and sports lover.

Career 
McGrady has been photographing political and social events of the Aboriginal and Torres Strait Islander peoples and families of the Redfern, Surry Hills, and Waterloo communities for 30 years from her perspective as a Gomeroi woman.

She is the first Indigenous photojournalist in Australia.

She specialises in recording Indigenous Australian sporting figures and events. Among the famous people McGrady has photographed are prominent activist for Australia's First Nations People, Gary Foley, a human rights activist and historian at Victoria University, Melbourne, who is also a personal friend. According to Foley, McGrady is a "true historian" because she documents Aboriginal experience.

Her works include iconic images of Adam Goodes with Lewis Jetta and Lance (Buddy) Franklin and the Indigenous round in AFL football; world champion Aboriginal boxer Anthony "Choc" Mundine; the Koori Knockout Carnival (one of the biggest Indigenous gatherings in Australia); and the Sista Girls of the Sydney Mardi Gras. She has also photographed Prince Harry, as well as concerts by British singer Ed Sheeran, and American rappers Nelly and Snoop Dogg.

In 2020, her significant new audiovisual multi-channel installation, Ngiyaningy Maran Yaliwaunga Ngaara-li (Our Ancestors Are Always Watching), produced in collaboration with photographer and filmmaker John Janson-Moore, was presented at Campbelltown Arts Centre.

She donates much time pro bono for community assignments.

Publication and recognition
McGrady's work has been published in outlets such as NAIDOC, NITV, National Indigenous Times, Reconciliation Australia, Aboriginal Legal Service, and Gadigal Information Service.

McGrady features in "Through the Lens with Barbara McGrady", an episode in the 2013 documentary television series Desperate Measures. It is available on SBS on Demand.

Awards 
 2014: Anthony Mundine Courage Award, part of the inaugural National Indigenous Human Rights Awards
 2015: Solid Screen International Award for Indigenous Women in Film and Photography, for photo media documentation

Personal life
Despite the esteem in which McGrady is held as a photojournalist, she still faces everyday racism in Australia. She is a close friend of fellow photojournalist Lisa Hogben.

She suffers from COPD, which hinders her physical movement.

Exhibitions 
 2013: Head On Festival; Visions in Black and White – Images from Indigenous Australia Redfern Community Centre, Sydney
 2014: Head On Photographic Exhibition: McGrady held a one-woman exhibition of her work at The Rocks Discovery Museum 15 May to 20 July 2014
 2017: Always Will Be, at the Australian Centre for Photography, 3 November – 9 December 2017, curated by Sandy Evans and complemented by NITV & ACP Online Resource
 2018: Inner City NAIDOC – Deadly Women of Redfern by Aunty Barbara McGrady
 2020: Campbelltown Arts Centre
 2020: Artist Talk with John Janson-Moore
 2020: As part of the 2020 Biennale of Sydney, McGrady's work was hung in the Art Gallery of New South Wales. Her 2013 image of TJ Hickey's family was hung in the gallery's Entrance Court. However the Biennale was cancelled and the Gallery closed in line with the NSW government's social distancing regulations during the COVID-19 pandemic in Australia.

Collections
Some of McGrady's works are held in the Australian Museum in Sydney.

Footnotes

References

External links
Barbara McGrady on Google Arts and Culture

1950 births
Living people
Australian women photographers
Indigenous Australian artists